Samatar is a Somali language surname.

People with the surname 

Abdi Ismail Samatar (born 1950), Somali scholar, writer and professor
Ahmed Ismail Samatar (born 1950), Somali writer
Hasan Adan Samatar (born 1953), Somali singer and guitarist
Hawa Abdi Samatar (born 19??), Somali political figure
Hussein Samatar (1964–2013), Somali-American politician, banker and community organizer
Mohammad Ali Samatar (1931–2016), Somali politician and Lieutenant General
Sahra Mohamed Ali Samatar (born 19??), Somali politician
Said Sheikh Samatar (1943–2015), Somali scholar and writer
Sofia Samatar (born 1971), Somali American educator, poet and writer

Places 

 Samatar Crossing, a shared-use path in Minneapolis, Minnesota, United States

References

Somali-language surnames